Checkpoint Bravo ("Checkpoint B") was the name given by the Western Allies to the main Autobahn border crossing point between West Berlin and the German Democratic Republic. Drewitz is a community nearby, and Dreilinden is the name of the wooded area in Berlin through which the highway passes.

Geography
The checkpoint was located on the A 115 motorway (known within Berlin as the AVUS), between the Berliner locality of Nikolassee and the Brandenburger rural community of Drewitz, part of the municipality of Kleinmachnow.

History
The checkpoint was the nearest motorway border crossing point to the Helmstedt–Marienborn border crossing ("Checkpoint Alpha") on the border of West Germany, making it part of the shortest highway transit route between West Germany and West Berlin.

The checkpoint was shifted slightly during 1969 from Drewitz (part of Potsdam), after the East German authorities realigned the transit route to eliminate a brief re-entry into GDR territory before transit traffic could finally enter West Berlin. The new checkpoint was relocated to Nikolassee (part of the district of Zehlendorf).

Since German reunification

The site of the original, pre-1969 checkpoint (rest stop, adjacent car park and abandoned highway) was used in filming the  television series. The site itself, "which includes a derelict bridge and a crumbling cafe covered in graffiti," was auctioned in September 2010 for €45,000.

The vast site of the East-German checkpoint was eventually converted into a commercial park named  . All that remains of the checkpoint is the former main control tower that now houses a museum of the checkpoint.

Gallery

See also
 Berlin border crossings
 Helmstedt–Marienborn border crossing (Checkpoint Alpha)
 Checkpoint Charlie

References

External links

Checkpoint Bravo official website 

Berlin border crossings
20th century in Brandenburg
Buildings and structures in Steglitz-Zehlendorf
Allied occupation of Germany
Checkpoints